Giuseppe Cei, C.O. (1640–1704) was a Roman Catholic prelate who served as Bishop of Cortona (1695–1704).

Biography
Giuseppe Cei was born in Livorno, Italy in 1640 and ordained a priest in the Congregation of the Oratory of Saint Philip Neri.
On 28 November 1695, he was appointed during the papacy of Pope Innocent XII as Bishop of Cortona.
On 30 November 1695, he was consecrated bishop by Bandino Panciatici, Cardinal-Priest of San Pancrazio with Michelangelo Mattei, Titular Patriarch of Antioch, and Sperello Sperelli, Bishop of Terni, serving as co-consecrators. 
He served as Bishop of Cortona until his death on 6 March 1704.

References

External links and additional sources
 (for Chronology of Bishops) 
 (for Chronology of Bishops) 

17th-century Italian Roman Catholic bishops
18th-century Italian Roman Catholic bishops
Bishops appointed by Pope Innocent XII
1640 births
1704 deaths
People from Livorno
Oratorian bishops